Clara may refer to:

Organizations
 CLARA, Latin American academic computer network organization
 Clara.Net, a European ISP
 Consolidated Land and Rail Australia, a property development consortium

People

 Clara (given name), a feminine given name (includes a list of people and fictional characters with this name)
 Saint Clara or Clare of Assisi

 Surname
 Florian Clara (born 1988), Italian luger 
 Roland Clara (born 1982), Italian cross country skier

Places

France
 Clara, Pyrénées-Orientales, a commune of the Pyrénées-Orientales département in southwestern France

Ireland
 Clara, County Kilkenny, a parish
 Clara, County Offaly, a town in Ireland
 Clara Bog, a wetland near the town of Clara, County Offaly
 Clara, County Wicklow, sometimes referred to as the "smallest village in Ireland"

United Kingdom
Clara Vale, a village in Tyne and Wear, England

United States
Clara, Florida, area on the border of Taylor County and Dixie County
 Clara City, Minnesota
 Clara, Mississippi, a small community in the United States
 Clara Township, Potter County, Pennsylvania, a township in the United States
 Santa Clara, California, a city in Santa Clara County

Extra-terrestrial
 642 Clara, a minor planet orbiting the Sun

Other uses
 Clara (beverage), a Spanish term for shandy
 Clara GAA, sports club in County Kilkenny, Ireland
 Clara GAA (Offaly), sports club in County Offaly, Ireland 
 Clara railway station, County Offaly, Ireland 
 Clara (Mirbeau), the main character in Octave Mirbeau's 1899 novel The Torture Garden
 Clara (magazine), French feminist magazine
 Clara (opera), a 1998 opera by Hans Gefors, libretto by Jean-Claude Carrière
 Clara (moth), a genus of moth
 Clara (plant), a genus of plant in subfamily Agavoideae
 Clara (rhinoceros), which toured Europe in the mid-18th century
 Clara (TV series), a German TV series
 Clara cells, former name of club cells in the lungs
 Clara.io, an online 3D modeling, animation and rendering tool
 Clara, a 1987 one-act stage play by Arthur Miller
 Clara, a 2006 song from "The Drift" by Scott Walker
 Clara (2018 film), a Canadian sci-fi drama
 Clara (2019 film), a Ukrainian animated fantasy film

See also
 Clare (disambiguation)
 Clarissa (disambiguation)
 Klara (disambiguation)